Bozeman is a city and the county seat of Gallatin County, Montana, United States. Located in southwest Montana, the 2020 census put Bozeman's population at 53,293, making it the fourth-largest city in Montana. It is the principal city of the Bozeman, MT Micropolitan Statistical Area, consisting of all of Gallatin County with a population of 118,960. It is the largest micropolitan statistical area in Montana, the fastest growing micropolitan statistical area in the United States in 2018, 2019 and 2020, as well as the second-largest of all Montana's statistical areas.

History

Early history

For many years, indigenous people of the United States, including the Shoshone, Nez Perce, Blackfeet, Flathead, Crow Nation and Sioux traveled through the area, called the "Valley of the Flowers". The Gallatin Valley in particular, in which Bozeman is located, was primarily within the territory of the Crow people.

19th century

William Clark visited the area in July 1806 as he traveled east from Three Forks along the Gallatin River. The journal entries from Clark's party briefly describe the future city's location.

John Bozeman

In 1863, John Bozeman, along with a partner named John Jacob, opened the Bozeman Trail, a new northern trail off the Oregon Trail leading to the mining town of Virginia City through the Gallatin Valley and the future location of the city of Bozeman.

John Bozeman, with Daniel Rouse and William Beall, platted the town in August 1864, stating "standing right in the gate of the mountains ready to swallow up all tenderfeet that would reach the territory from the east, with their golden fleeces to be taken care of." Red Cloud's War closed the Bozeman Trail in 1868, but the town's fertile land still attracted permanent settlers.

Nelson Story

In 1866, Nelson Story, a successful Virginia City, Montana, gold miner originally from Ohio, entered the cattle business. Story braved the hostile Bozeman Trail to successfully drive some 1,000 head of longhorn cattle into Paradise Valley just east of Bozeman. Eluding the U.S. Army, who tried to turn Story back to protect the drive from hostile Indians, Story's cattle formed one of the earliest significant herds in Montana's cattle industry. Story established a sizable ranch in the Paradise Valley and holdings in the Gallatin Valley. He later donated land to the state for the establishment of Montana State University.

Fort Ellis

Fort Ellis , el.  was established in 1867 by Captain R. S. LaMotte and two companies of the 2nd Cavalry, after the murder of John Bozeman near the mouth of Mission Creek on Yellowstone River , and considerable political disturbance in the area led local settlers and miners to feel a need for added protection. The fort, named for Gettysburg casualty Colonel Augustus Van Horne Ellis, was decommissioned in 1886 and few remnants are left at the actual site, now occupied by the Fort Ellis Experimental Station of Montana State University. In addition to Fort Ellis, a short-lived fort, Fort Elizabeth Meagher (also simply known as Fort Meagher), was established in 1867 by volunteer militiamen. This fort was located eight miles (13km) east of town on Rocky Creek., el.

Other
In 1864, W.W. described Gallatin County as "one of the most beautiful and picturesque valleys the eye ever beheld, abounding in springs of clear water." Many tended to agree, and Bozeman quickly garnered the nickname of "The Egypt" of Montana.  

After incorporation, the first issue of the weekly Avant Courier newspaper, the precursor of today's Bozeman Chronicle, was published in Bozeman on September 13, 1871.

Bozeman's main cemetery, Sunset Hills Cemetery, was given to the city in 1872 when the English lawyer and philanthropist William Henry Blackmore purchased the land after his wife Mary Blackmore died of pneumonia in Bozeman in July 1872.

The first library in Bozeman was formed by the Young Men's Library Association in a room above a drugstore in 1872. It later moved to the mayor's office and was taken over by the city in 1890.
The first Grange meeting in Montana Territory was held in Bozeman in 1873. The Northern Pacific Railway reached Bozeman from the east in 1883. By 1900, Bozeman's population had reached 3,500.

In 1892, the United States Commission of Fish and Fisheries established a fish hatchery on Bridger Creek at the entrance to Bridger Canyon. The fourth oldest fish hatchery in the United States, the facility ceased to be primarily a hatchery in 1966 and became the U.S. Fish and Wildlife Service's Bozeman National Fish Hatchery, later a fish technology and fish health center. The Center receives approximately 5,000 visitors a year observing biologists working on diet testing, feed manufacturing technology, fish diseases, brood stock development and improvement of water quality.

Bozeman was home to early minor league baseball. In 1892, Bozeman fielded a team in the Class B level Montana State League. In 1909, the Bozeman Irrigators played as members of the Class D level Inter-Mountain League. Both leagues disbanded.

Montana State University was established in 1893 as the state's land-grant college, then named the Agricultural College of the State of Montana. By the 1920s, the institution was known as Montana State College, and in 1965 it became Montana State University.

20th century

Bozeman's first high school, the Gallatin Valley High School, was built on West Main Street in 1902. Later known as Willson School, named for notable Bozeman architect Fred Fielding Willson, son of Lester S. Willson, the building still stands today and functions as administrative offices for the Bozeman School District.

By the 1920s, canneries in the Bozeman area were major producers of canned peas, and at one point Bozeman produced approximately 75% of all seed peas in the United States. The area was once known as the "Sweet Pea capital of the nation" referencing the prolific edible pea crop. To promote the area and celebrate its prosperity, local business owners began a "Sweet Pea Carnival" that included a parade and queen contest. The annual event lasted from 1906 to 1916. Promoters used the inedible but fragrant and colorful sweet pea flower as an emblem of the celebration. In 1977 the "Sweet Pea" concept was revived as an arts festival rather than a harvest celebration, growing into a three-day event that is one of the largest festivals in Montana.

The first federal building and Post Office was built in 1915. Many years later, while empty, it was a film location, along with downtown Bozeman, in A River Runs Through It (1992) by Robert Redford, starring Brad Pitt. It is now used by HRDC, a community organization.

The Bridger Bowl Ski Area operates as a 501(c)(4) organization by the Bridger Bowl Association, and is located on the northeast face of the Bridger Mountains, utilizing state and federal land. Bridger Bowl was Bozeman's first ski area and opened to the public in 1955. The resort has grown considerably since 1973 into a residential community and major winter tourist destination.

In 1986, the  site of the Idaho Pole Co. on Rouse Avenue was designated a Superfund site and placed on the National Priorities List. Idaho Pole treated wood products with creosote and pentachlorophenol on the site between 1945 and 1997.

The Museum of the Rockies was created in 1957 as the gift from Butte physician Caroline McGill and is a part of Montana State University and an affiliate institution of the Smithsonian. It is Montana's premier natural and cultural history museum and houses permanent exhibits on dinosaurs, geology and Montana history, as well as a planetarium and a living history farm. Paleontologist Jack Horner was the museum's first curator of paleontology and brought national notice to the museum for his fossil discoveries in the 1980s.

Bozeman receives a steady influx of new residents and visitors in part due to its plentiful recreational activities such as fly fishing, hiking, whitewater kayaking, and mountain climbing. Additionally, Bozeman is a gateway community through which visitors pass on the way to Yellowstone National Park and its abundant wildlife and thermal features. The showcasing of spectacular scenery and the western way of life the area received from films set nearby, such as A River Runs Through It and The Horse Whisperer, have also served to draw people to the area.

21st century

In the past forty years, Bozeman has grown from the sixth- to the fourth-largest city in Montana. The area attracts new residents due to quality of life, scenery, and nearby recreation. In August 2010, Bozeman was selected by Outside as the best place to live in the west for skiing.

Growth in the Gallatin Valley prompted the Gallatin Airport Authority in 2009 to expand the Gallatin Field Airport with two new gates, an expanded passenger screening area, and a third baggage carousel. Gallatin Field was subsequently renamed Bozeman Yellowstone International Airport.
Bozeman has been one of Montana's fastest growing cities from 1990 into the new millennium. At the rate of three percent, Bozeman could surpass Great Falls as Montana's third largest city by 2025.

Geography and climate

The Bridger Mountains are to the north-northeast, the Tobacco Root Mountains to the west-southwest, the Big Belt Mountains and Horseshoe Hills to the northwest, the Hyalite Peaks of the northern Gallatin Range to the south and the Spanish Peaks of the northern Madison Range to the south-southwest. Bozeman is east of the continental divide, and Interstate 90 passes through the city.

Bozeman experiences a Humid continental climate (Köppen: Dfb) as it is located in a more humid microclimate setting. Combined with fertile soils, plant growth is relatively lush. This undoubtedly contributed to the early nickname "Valley of the Flowers" and the establishment of Montana State University as the state's agricultural college. Bozeman has cold, snowy winters and relatively warm summers, though due to elevation, temperature changes from day to night can be significant. The lowest recorded temperature, occurred on December 22, 2022.

Unlike most of the country, Bozeman has actually gotten cooler with the new 1991–2020 normals. Average highs dropped by 1.7°F (0.72°C), especially in spring and summer. It has also gotten wetter and snowier.

In 2019, Bozeman experienced unusually warm and dry temperatures during the month of December. Montana State University campus reported a daily average of 0.20 inches of precipitation for the month, some of the lowest numbers seen in over 120 years. Montana State University also recorded just over 3 inches of snowfall during December, the second lowest snowfall ever recorded. Additionally, maximum temperatures were 2 degrees warmer and lowest temperatures were 6 degrees above typical standards in previous Decembers.

Demographics

2010 census

As of the census of 2010, there were 37,280 people, 15,775 households, and 6,900 families residing in the city. The racial makeup of the city was 93.6% White, 0.5% African American, 1.1% Native American, 1.9% Asian, 0.1% Pacific Islander, 0.7% from other races, and 2.1% from two or more races. Hispanic or Latino of any race were 2.9% of the population.

There were 15,775 households, of which 21.3% had children under the age of 18 living with them, 33.1% were married couples living together, 7.0% had a female householder with no husband present, 3.6% had a male householder with no wife present, and 56.3% were non-families. 33.5% of all households were made up of individuals, and 7.6% had someone living alone who was 65 years of age or older. The average household size was 2.17 and the average family size was 2.80.

The median age in the city was 27.2 years. 15.7% of residents were under the age of 18; 28.2% were between the ages of 18 and 24; 31.4% were from 25 to 44; 16.7% were from 45 to 64; and 8.1% were 65 years of age or older. The gender makeup of the city was 52.6% male and 47.4% female.

2000 census

As of the census of 2000, there were 27,509 people, 10,877 households, and 5,014 families residing in the city. The population density was 2,183.8 people per square mile (843.0/km2). There were 11,577 housing units at an average density of 919.0 per square mile (354.8/km2). The racial makeup of the city was 94.73% White, 0.33% African American, 1.24% Native American, 1.62% Asian, 0.07% Pacific Islander, 0.54% from other races, and 1.47% from two or more races. Hispanic or Latino of any race were 1.59% of the population.

There were 10,877 households, out of which 22.3% had children under the age of 18 living with them, 36.0% were married couples living together, 7.3% had a female householder with no husband present, and 53.9% were non-families. 30.4% of all households were made up of individuals, and 6.7% had someone living alone who was 65 years of age or older. The average household size was 2.26 and the average family size was 2.85.

In the city, the population was spread out, with 16.0% under the age of 18, 33.0% from 18 to 24, 28.6% from 25 to 44, 14.4% from 45 to 64, and 8.0% who were 65 years of age or older. The median age was 25 years. For every 100 females, there were 111.2 males. For every 100 females age 18 and over, there were 112.6 males.

The median income for a household in the city was $32,156, and the median income for a family was $41,723. Males had a median income of $28,794 versus $20,743 for females. The per capita income for the city was $16,104. About 9.2% of families and 20.2% of the population were below the poverty line, including 14.8% of those under age 18 and 4.4% of those age 65 or over.

Government

Bozeman became an incorporated Montana city in April 1883 and adopted a city council form of government. Currently, the City of Bozeman uses a city commission/city manager form of government which the citizens adopted on January 1, 1922 with an elected Municipal Judge. The City Commission is chaired by an elected Mayor. These three entities form the legislative, executive and judicial branches of government.

Departments

 Finance DepartmentProvides financial administration, treasury and accounting services, grant administration and sustainability management.
 Fire DepartmentBozeman is served by the Bozeman Fire Department which is a full-time career fire department. There are currently 47 uniformed firefighters at three stations, four engines (one reserve), a ladder truck, a Battalion Chief's truck, 2 brush trucks, a HazMat unit, and 2 Medic Units. The Bozeman Fire Department responded to approximately 5,000 emergency calls in 2020.
 Park, Recreation and Cemetery DepartmentOperates the Sunset Hills Cemetery, maintains public parks throughout the city to include the East Gallatin Recreation Area and conducts recreational programs for the citizens of Bozeman.
 Public Service DepartmentProvides engineering, forestry, signs and signals, solid waste, street, vehicle maintenance, water reclamation, water and sewer and water treatment services for the citizens of Bozeman.

Education

Public

 The Bozeman Public School District operates two high schoolsBozeman High School and Gallatin High School; two middle schoolsChief Joseph Middle School and Sacajawea Middle School; and eight elementary schoolsEmily Dickinson Elementary School, Hawthorne Elementary School, Hyalite Elementary School, Irving Elementary School, Longfellow Elementary School, Meadowlark Elementary School, Morning Star Elementary School, and Whittier Elementary School.
 The district also operates the Bridger Alternative Program as a branch campus of Bozeman High School to serve "at-risk" secondary students.
 The former Emerson Elementary School is now a cultural community center. Willson School, originally a high school, then a middle school, then the base for an alternative high school, is still owned by the school district and houses a number of school district offices.

Private

 Mount Ellis Academy is a co-educational boarding high school (grades9 through 12) affiliated with the Seventh-day Adventist Church, and Headwaters Academy near the campus of Montana State University.

Post-secondary

 Bozeman is home to Montana State University, the state's largest university and the flagship campus of the Montana State University System. MSU set a new fall enrollment record in the fall of 2018, at a total of 16,902 students on campus.

Media

Newspapers and Magazines
 Bozeman Avant Courierpublished 1871–1905
 The Republican-courierpublished 1905–1913
 The Bozeman Courierpublisher 1919–1954
 Bozeman Daily Chronicle
 Bozeman Magazine is a free monthly publication.
 The BoZone Entertainment and Events Calendar has been publishing since 1993, a free biweekly publication owned by Bozeman Entertainment, LLC.
 The Montana Pioneer is a monthly newspaper of some decades' history, based in nearby Livingston but serving both areas.

AM Radio

 KBOZ 1090, (Talk/Personality), Reier Broadcasting Company
 KOBB 1230, (sports talk), Reier Broadcasting Company
 KPRK AM 1340, (Classic Hits), Townsquare Media
 KMMS 1450, (News/Talk), Townsquare Media
  KYWL AM 1490, (Active Rock)
FM Radio

 KGLT 91.9, (Variety), Montana State University
 KMMS-FM 94.7, (Adult Album), Townsquare Media
 KISN 96.7, (Top 40 (CHR)), Townsquare Media
 KXLB 100.7, (Country music), Townsquare Media
 KBMC (FM) 102.1, (Variety), Montana State University-Billings
 KZMY 103.5, (Hot Adult Contemporary), Townsquare Media
 KBZM 104.7, (Classic Rock),  Orion Media LLC
 KKQX 105.7, (Classic Rock),  Orion Media LLC
 KSCY 106.9, (Country music), Orion Media LLC

Defunct

 KOZB 97.5, (Classic rock), Reier Broadcasting Company
 KBOZ-FM 99.9, (Country music), Reier Broadcasting Company
 KOBB-FM 93.7, (Oldies), Reier Broadcasting Company

Television

 KDBZ-CD 6 NBC, Sinclair Broadcast Group
 KBZK 7 CBS, E. W. Scripps Company
 KUSM 9 PBS, Montana State University
 KWYB-LD 28-1 ABC, Cowles Company (LP relay from Butte)
 KWYB-LD 28-2 FOX

In popular culture

The Bozeman area has served as a filming site for a number of films, including The Wildest Dream, A River Runs Through It, A Plumm Summer and Amazing Grace and Chuck. Aside from being shot in Bozeman, A Plumm Summer featured two local actors, Ben Trotter and John Hosking, as well as many local extras. Films shot in the nearby Paradise Valley south of Livingston and Big Timber areas, such as The Horse Whisperer and Rancho Deluxe also headquartered out of Bozeman due to its status as the largest community in the local trade area. It was also the setting for The Ninth Nugget, a children's book by Ron Roy that is a part of the A-Z Mysteries series. The 2022 Paramount+ Western drama television series 1923 features scenes of early 1920's Bozeman (filmed in Uptown Butte).

Bozeman also features in the film Star Trek: First Contact as the launch site of the first warp ship and location of first contact.

In popular music, the members of the noise rock group Steel Pole Bath Tub are originally from Bozeman, and wrote a song titled "Bozeman" on their third album, The Miracle of Sound in Motion. The 1980s hard rock band Vixen also featured a former Bozeman resident, Janet Gardner, as lead singer.

Literary references include the Bozeman area and real-life Bozeman artists Bob and Gennie DeWeese as a key setting in Robert Pirsig's novel Zen and the Art of Motorcycle Maintenance; the narrator was a professor teaching English composition while developing his philosophical ideas, reflecting the author's own history; Pirsig taught at Montana State. John Steinbeck passed through Bozeman via the former U.S. Route 10 as well as venturing into Yellowstone National Park, and recounted his impressions of Montana in Travels with Charley.

National media coverage

On March 5, 2009, the city of Bozeman made national news when an early morning explosion destroyed three buildings in the historic downtown area. Several other buildings were damaged and one person was killed. The blast occurred about 8:15a.m. and prompted the evacuation of a two-block area. Investigators found the cause of the explosion to be a leak in a gas line that led to a business that was destroyed in the blast. The gas line was more than 70 years old. Business owners and local residents later filed major lawsuits against Northwestern Energy, the company in charge of the gas line. The suits claimed negligence for the gas leak that led to the blast. As of December 2010, most of the lawsuits against the energy company were settled.

In June of the same year, Bozeman was once again in the national news when it was reported that the city government was requesting job applicants provide their user names and passwords to social networking sites. A passage from the city's application form said, "Please list any and all current personal or business Web sites, web pages or memberships on any Internet-based chat rooms, social clubs or forums, to include, but not limited to: Facebook, Google, Yahoo, YouTube.com, MySpace, etc."

After the initial news story aired, the Bozeman City Commissioner received e-mails and phone calls expressing indignation about the practice from across the nation. Bozeman residents were astonished and alarmed by the request. The local government believed the practice had been going on as part of a background search for about three years. In response to the negative backlash from the news media and local citizens, the city rescinded the policy on June 20, 2009, just two days after the news broke.

In March 2021 an episode of The Indicator, a spin-off podcast from NPR's Planet Money, covered a property boom in Bozeman due to remote working. The show states that the median home price in Bozeman is about 75% above the national median, while the median household income of about $50,000 is 25% below the national median. It concludes, "Bottom line, if you are a Bozeman local working a job in Bozeman, buying a house is becoming financially out of reach. The math doesn't work."

Transportation

U.S. Highway 191 runs south from Bozeman to Big Sky and West Yellowstone. Montana Highway 86 runs north alongside the Bridger Range to U.S. 89. Montana Highway 84 runs west to U.S. 287 in Norris.

Freight rail service is provided by Montana Rail Link, a privately held Class II railroad that connects Spokane, Washington, with Huntley, Montana. The city was last served by passenger rail in 1979 by the North Coast Hiawatha at Bozeman Depot.

Bozeman has operated a free public bus system called Streamline since 2006. Streamline operates four routes covering the University, Bozeman-Deaconess Hospital, Gallatin Valley Mall, 7th Avenue and 19th Avenue shopping areas, and downtown. The system is funded by a variety of Federal, State, and local sources. The Gallatin Big Sky Transportation District has operated the Skyline bus service between Bozeman and Big Sky since December 2006.

One of the three major regional airports serving southwest Montana is Bozeman Yellowstone International Airport west of Bozeman on the outskirts of Belgrade, Montana. It primarily serves travelers to Bozeman, Big Sky, West Yellowstone and Yellowstone National Park.

Notable people

The following individuals are either notable current or former residents of Bozeman (R), were born or raised in Bozeman in their early years (B), or otherwise have a significant connection to the history of the Bozeman area (C).

Sports personalities
 Conrad Anker, mountaineer C
 Brock Coyle, linebacker for San Francisco 49ers, Seattle Seahawks B
 Will Dissly, Tight End for Seattle Seahawks B
 Jeff Fisher, Head Coach for Tennessee Titans and Los Angeles Rams R
 Nikki Kimball, distance runner R
 Dane Fletcher, linebacker for New England Patriots, Tampa Bay Buccaneers B
 Alex Lowe, ice-climber and alpinist R
 Darren Main, yoga instructor R
 Mike McLeod, former NFL safety B
 Heather McPhie, freestyle skier, member of 2010 US Olympic team B
 Phil Olsen, former National Football League lineman R
 Willie Saunders, Bozeman-born Canadian Horse Racing Hall of Fame jockey, won U.S. Triple Crown B
 Jan Stenerud, member of Pro Football Hall of Fame, AFL and NFL placekicker for Kansas City Chiefs, Green Bay Packers and Minnesota Vikings; winner of Super Bowl IV R
 Kevin Sweeney, former quarterback for Dallas Cowboys B
 Tejay van Garderen, professional cyclist R

Military and pioneers
 Travis Atkins, Medal of Honor recipient R
 John Bozeman, pioneer and founder of the Bozeman Trail C
 Henry Comstock, a discoverer of Comstock Lode died (suicide) in Bozeman on September 29, 1870 C
 Gustavus Cheyney Doane, member of Washburn-Langford-Doane Expedition 1870 and buried in Sunset Hills Cemetery, Bozeman
 Nelson Story, prominent cattleman and merchant in Bozeman's early years R
 Lester S. Willson, prominent merchant in Bozeman's early years R

Arts, culture and entertainment
 Kris Atteberry, MLB broadcaster, one of only two Montanans to call an MLB game B
 Brannon Braga, writer and producer of Star Trek television shows and films B
 Deborah Butterfield, sculptor known for use of horses in artwork R
 Gary Cooper, film actor, attended Gallatin Valley High School in Bozeman R
 Daniella Deutscher, actress B
 Pablo Elvira, opera singer R
 Landon Jones, journalist and author R
 Donna Kelley, former CNN anchor and current KBZK anchor. R
 Jane Lawrence, actress and opera singer B
 Jason Lytle, lead singer of Modesto band, Grandaddy; solo artist R
 Julian MacKay, ballet dancer B
 John Mayer, musical artist and songwriter R
 Ben Mikaelsen, author R
 Christopher Parkening, guitarist, fly casting champion R
 David Quammen, long-time columnist for Outside magazine, and author R
 Steven Rinella, American outdoorsman, conservationist, writer, and television personality
 Albert, Alfred and Chris Schlechten multi-generation family of photographers noted for portraiture and images of Yellowstone National Park and the Gallatin Valley. R, R, B
 James Willard Schultz, author and Glacier National Park explorer, lived in Bozeman 1928–1929 with partner Jessica McDonald, professor at Montana State; R Schultz's papers are archived at Montana State Burlingame Special Collections Library.
 Michael Spears, actor R
 Eddie Spears, actor R
 Julia Thorne, writer and ex-wife of 2004 Democratic Presidential candidate John Kerry R
 Kathy Tyers, writer, particularly known for contribution to Star Wars series R
 Peter Voulkos, ceramic artist B
 Sarah Vowell, author, regular on This American Life, voice actress from The Incredibles, B
 Dave Walker, musician R

Science and academia
 Loren Acton, astronaut and physicist R
 Don G. Despain, botanist, ecologist, and fire behavior specialist R
 Zefram Cochrane, (fictional) creator of the warp drive C
 Christopher Langan, scientist  was born in San Francisco but grew up mostly in Bozeman
 Diana L. Eck, Professor of Comparative Religion at Harvard University B
 Dr. James A. Henshall, first superintendent of Bozeman Fish Technology Center C
 Alice Haskins, government botanist and professor R
 Jack Horner, preeminent paleontologist upon whom main character, Dr. Alan Grant, in book and film Jurassic Park was patterned R
 Dale W. Jorgenson, Harvard University professor and economist B
 Robert M. Pirsig, author and past instructor of English and rhetoric at Montana State University R
 Ann Linnea Sandberg, immunologist R

Politics, government and business
 Brooke D. Anderson, former Ambassador to the United Nations
 Les AuCoin, former U.S. congressman from Oregon R
 John Bohlinger, Lieutenant Governor of Montana B
 Dorothy Bradley, former state legislator, congressional and gubernatorial candidate R
 Will Brooke, former chief of staff of Conrad Burns R
 Matt Christiansen, YouTuber, podcaster R
 Steve Daines, entrepreneur, business leader and Montana's current junior Senator B
 Zales Ecton, Republican politician in the 1930s B
 Greg Gianforte, Governor of Montana, former US Representative in Montana's at-large congressional district R
 Charles S. Hartman, United States Congressman from Montana R
 Christopher Hedrick, entrepreneur and international development expert R
 Stan Jones, Libertarian Party candidate for Montana governor and United States Senator R
 Vanessa Kerry, daughter of politician John Kerry R
 Michael McFaul, former United States Ambassador to Russia R
 Scott Sales, former Speaker of the Montana House of Representatives R
 Raymond Strother, Democratic political consultant R
 Sidney Runyan Thomas, judge of the United States Court of Appeals for the Ninth Circuit B
 Ted Turner, entrepreneur (Ted's Montana Grill) and founder of cable television empires including CNN and TBS R

Philanthropy
 Greg Mortenson, humanitarian and founder of the Central Asia Institute R

Religion
 Elizabeth Clare Prophet, co-founder of Church Universal and Triumphant R

Architecture
 Fred F. Willson, designed many notable buildings in Bozeman between 1902 and 1956. R

Business and industry
Bozeman's top employers include Bozeman Health, Montana State University, Simms Fishing Products and Mystery Ranch as well as at least two dozen high-tech companies engaged in research or production of lasers and other optical equipment, over a dozen bio-tech companies, and several large software companies. Nationally known companies based in Bozeman include ILX Lightwave (an MKS/Newport company), Quantel USA, RightNow Technologies, Snowflake Inc., Schedulicity, Workvia, onX and Simms Fishing Products. Notable non-profit organizations based in Bozeman include the Greater Yellowstone Coalition, Human Resource Development Council (HRDC) and Eagle Mount.

Points of interest

 Museums and gardens
 Montana Arboretum and Gardens
 Museum of the Rockies
 American Computer Museum
 Gallatin Historical Society-The Pioneer Museum
 Story Mansion
 Libraries
 Bozeman Public Library
 Renne Library, Montana State University
 Ski areas
 Bridger Bowl Ski Area
 Universities and colleges
 Montana State University
 Other
 Gibson Guitar Factory
 U.S. Fish and Wildlife Service Fish Technology Center, established 1892,
 Sweet Pea-A Festival of the ArtsAnnual festival held in Bozeman annually since 1977. The Sweet Pea Carnival was first established in 1906.
 Hyalite Canyon and Reservoir
 East Gallatin Recreation Area

See also

 Bozeman Pass
 Bozeman Trail

References

Further reading

External links

 Official website
 Chamber of Commerce
account of 1873 lynching Bozeman Montana True West Magazine November 2015 pp.26-29

 
Cities in Montana
Cities in Gallatin County, Montana
County seats in Montana
Populated places established in 1864
1864 establishments in Montana Territory